Judith Sirs (born 6 March 1954) is a British former swimmer. She competed in the women's 4 × 100 metre freestyle relay at the 1972 Summer Olympics.

References

1954 births
Living people
British female swimmers
Olympic swimmers of Great Britain
Swimmers at the 1972 Summer Olympics
Sportspeople from Hartlepool